Christian monasticism first appeared in Egypt and Syria. This is a partial chronology of early Christian monasticism with its notable events listed. It covers 343 years.

References 

Chronology
Christian monasticism
Early Christian Monasticism
History of Catholic monasticism